All In (stylized in all caps) is the first Japanese extended play (eighth overall) by South Korean boy group Stray Kids. It was released on October 27, 2020, digitally and November 4 physically. The lead single "All In" was released on October 20. This EP also includes the Japanese versions of "God's Menu", and "Back Door". and previous released single, "Top".

Release
This extended play was released in four versions: first press limited edition A, first press limited edition B, first press limited edition C, and a regular edition.

Commercial performance
All In reached number-two on the weekly Oricon Albums Chart with 48,916 copies sold, and number-two on the Billboard Japan Hot Albums Chart.

Track listing

Notes
 "All In", "Fam", "Top", and "Slump" are stylized in all caps.
 Track 4 "" is pronounced as Kami Me'nyū.

Charts

Weekly charts

Year-end charts

Certifications

Release history

References

External links
  

2020 EPs
Japanese-language EPs
JYP Entertainment EPs
Sony Music Entertainment Japan EPs
Stray Kids EPs